Hubert Schöll (20 October 1946 – 23 November 1992) was a German football player. He spent five seasons in the Bundesliga with 1. FC Nürnberg and Hamburger SV.

Honours
 1. FC Nürnberg
 Bundesliga: 1967–68

References

External links
 

1946 births
German footballers
1. FC Nürnberg players
Hamburger SV players
KSV Hessen Kassel players
Bundesliga players
1992 deaths
Association football midfielders